Kumiko Tanaka-Ishii  is a computational linguist and a professor in Research Center for Advanced Science and Technology at the University of Tokyo, Japan. She is the author of Semiotics of Programming, an award-winning book semiotically analyzing computer programs along three axes: models of signs, kinds of signs, and systems of signs.

Personal 
Tanaka-Ishii received her doctorate from the University of Tokyo in 1997. In 1995, before completing her PhD, she was a visiting researcher at Laboratoire d'Informatique pour la Mécanique et les Sciences de l'Ingénieur (LIMSI) at the National Center for Scientific Research (CNRS) in Paris, where she worked on semantic proximity matrices for the Japanese language. In 2010 she was awarded both the Suntory Prize for Social Sciences and Humanities and the Okawa Publications Prize for her book, Semiotics of Programming. The book has been critically and favorably reviewed in Linguistic & Philosophical Investigations, Cognitive Technology Journal, and Semiotica.

Publications

Awards and recognition 
 Suntory Prize for Social Sciences and Humanities
 Okawa Publications Prize
 2011 Best Journal Paper Award, Association for Natural Language Processing: "A Study on Constants of Natural Language Texts"

References

External links 
 Personal Website
 Kumiko Tanaka-Ishii Group Website at the University of Tokyo

1969 births
Living people
Computational linguistics researchers
Academic staff of the University of Tokyo
University of Tokyo alumni